Colin Edwin is an Australian musician, specialising in fretted and fretless bass guitar, double bass and guimbri. 

Edwin first came to public attention as a member of the British progressive rock band Porcupine Tree, in which he was bass player from 1993 to 2011. Currently, Edwin is a member of Ex-Wise Heads, a long running collaboration with multi instrumentalist Geoff Leigh which mixes ethnic, ambient, and post-modern influences. He is also a member of metal-influenced project Random Noise Generator, and the bands Metallic Taste of Blood and progressive metal act O.R.k., as well as participating in numerous collaborations and releasing solo work.

Biography
Colin Edwin was born in Melbourne on 2 July 1970. During his childhood, his family moved to Hemel Hempstead, England, where he became a schoolfriend of the young Steven Wilson.

In December 1993, he joined Wilson's progressive rock band Porcupine Tree, in which he played bass guitar, double bass and guimbri. His time in the band lasted until its initial dissolution in 2011, and covered nine studio albums and thirteen live albums. Edwin also played double bass on occasion for Wilson's other main project No-Man, notably for 1993 radio sessions and on 2001's Returning Jesus album. 

In 1999, Edwin teamed with former Henry Cow instrumentalist Geoff Leigh and percussionist Vincent Salzfaas to form the instrumental ethno-fusion trio Ex-Wise Heads, who have gone on to record six albums (with the project later becoming a duo of Edwin and Leigh augmented by percussionist Rick Edwards and various guests).

Since 2009, Edwin has also been releasing solo work, including two solo albums (Third Vessel in 2009 and PVZ in 2012) both available through Burning Shed. He continues to regularly release standalone solo tracks via his Bandcamp page.

In 2011, Edwin formed the band "Metallic Taste of Blood"  with Italian musician Eraldo Bernocchi, Hungarian drummer Balazs Pandi and Keyboard player Jamie Saft, releasing an album on RareNoiseRecords.
With a new line-up featuring former Prong drummer Ted Parsons and keyboard player Roy Powell, Metallic Taste of Blood released a second album "Doctoring the Dead" in May 2015, also on RareNoise.

Edwin has continued working with Eraldo Bernocchi in the newest line-up of the band Obake, alongside vocalist Lorenzo Esposito Fornasari with their second album entitled Mutations, which was released in October 2014 on RareNoise.

Also in 2011, Edwin worked with American guitarist Jon Durant on the album Dance of the Shadow Planets and the two collaborated further on the album Burnt Belief released on the Alchemy Records label in 2012. Their third collaboration, Etymology, was released in October 2014.

Edwin has also collaborated with Italian bassist Lorenzo Feliciati, resulting in the album Twinscapes, released on RareNoise in 2014. The Twinscapes album also features contributions from Nils Petter Molvær, David Jackson, Roberto Gualdi and Andi Pupato, and was mixed by bassist and producer Bill Laswell Edwin is known to have an interest in photography and also took the cover image for the album.

In mid 2014 it was announced that Edwin would be joining experimental jazz rock band Henry Fool as well as participating in recording new material for a future album.

In 2015 Edwin joined Lorenzo Esposito Fornasari, guitarist Carmelo Pipitone and drummer Pat Mastelotto in a new band "O.R.k." releasing the albums Inflamed Rides., Soul of an Octopus., and Ramagehead,.

Edwin recorded the bass lines for the instrumental rock musical collective Armonite, releasing the albums The Sun is New each Day in 2015 and And the Stars above in 2018, the latter published by Cleopatra Records.

Edwin has also collaborated with Ukrainian female vocal duo Astarta, playing concerts in London and Ukraine  and releasing a full-length album in April 2016.

Style and equipment

Edwin is a jazz fan, and incorporates an atypical jazz-inspired style into his playing for a rock band. He also has a strong interest in world music and in electronica, reflected particularly in his work with Ex-Wise Heads and in his solo releases. 

In between 1994 and 2004, Edwin's main bass was a 1994 Wal Mark I four-string fretless bass, until he gave it "a break" and semi-retired it from the rigours of live touring. He subsequently used a Music Man StingRay and, for the Deadwing Tour, a Music Man Bongo which can be viewed in action on Porcupine Tree's DVD release Arriving Somewhere....

During that time period Edwin was introduced to Spector basses and purchased a EuroLX 4-string model in Natural Oil. The company then gave him one of their extended scale-length models (35" as opposed to the "standard" 34" scale for 4-string basses), a Euro 4LX-35 in transparent black. This proved to be useful as over half of their 2007 album, Fear of a Blank Planet was downtuned C/F/Bb/Eb to which the 35" scale length give better definition to the lower notes. For the second leg of the Fear of a Blank Planet Tour starting in October 2007 a ReBop Deluxe FM unlined fretless bass in Natural Oil was used for the song "A Smart Kid" among others, and well as using his Music Man Bongo bass guitar as his spare or encore bass.

As of late September 2009 Edwin was back to using his fretted and fretless Wal Mark I 4-string basses for the majority of the tour supporting the Porcupine Tree release of The Incident. He played approximately 85% of The Incident song-cycle on his Wal basses. His black Spector Euro 4LX-35 was used for the other 15% "heavy parts" which were down-tuned to C Standard. Edwin still endorses the Spector and Basslab basses as well as EBS amplifiers, speaker cabinets, and effects pedals. He endorses Ernie Ball Bass Strings for use on his Wal fretless bass and Spector Medium Stainless Steel Bass Strings on his fretted Spector basses.

Discography (Outside of Porcupine Tree)

Solo Albums

With Ex-Wise Heads

With Lorenzo Feliciati as Twinscapes

With Armonite

With Metallic Taste of Blood

With Obake

With Jon Durant 

With O.R.k.

With Tim Bowness

With Astarta as Astarta/Edwin

With Endless Tapes

With Gaudi

With Jon Durant and Inna Kovtun

Current equipment
 2012 Spector USA Series Bolt-On NS-4H2-MM Black Cherry High Gloss Custom Shop 4-string fretless bass (Unlined Ebony fingerboard) with EMG MM-TW pick-ups, Aguilar OBP-3 preamp & Hipshot hardware
 2006 Spector Euro 4LX-35 4-string bass downtuned to "C Standard" (C/F/Bb/Eb) in Transparent Black. strung with Spector Medium Stainless Steel strings.
 BassLab Soul-IV in Black (used mainly as a studio bass and also as a backup/encore bass on the "Fear of a Blank Planet" tour) strung with Ernie Ball Hybrid Slinky strings.
 BassLab Soul-IV in Metallic Orange (prototype bass borrowed from Heiko Hoepfinger used as a studio/recording bass
 EBS TD 650 amplifier and two 4x10" Proline neodymium cabs.
 EBS ValveDrive tube preamp/overdrive pedal, EBS MultiDrive distortion, EBS OctaBass octave, EBS MultiComp compressor, EBS UniChorus Chours, EBS Bass IQ Envelope Filter, EBS Tremolo, Boss HR-2 Harmonist, Boss TU-2 Chromatic Tuner.

Previously used equipment
 2007 Spector ReBop Deluxe FM unlined fretless bass in Natural Oil.
 2004 Music Man Stingray fretted 4-string bass (Natural ash finish, Rosewood fretboard ) with a Hipshot Bass Extender installed for downtuning the E-string to D.
 2005 Music Man Bongo 4-string bass in "Stealth (flat) Black" (used for the majority of the "Deadwing" tour as seen on the band's Arriving Somewhere... Live DVD and as a backup/encore bass on the 2007–08 "Fear of a Blank Planet" tour).
 Trace Elliott AH350 amplifier and speaker cabinets
 Tech 21 LM300 amplifier and two 4x10" speaker cabinets ("trashed on a European tour by some slack local crew")

References

External links

Official website
Colin Edwin's blog page
Article in "Bass Player" magazine September 2007

1970 births
Living people
Australian bass guitarists
Progressive metal bass guitarists
Progressive rock bass guitarists
Porcupine Tree members
21st-century bass guitarists
RareNoiseRecords artists